William Godfrey (1889–1963) was an English Cardinal of the Roman Catholic Church. He served as Archbishop of Westminster and de facto primate of England and Wales from 1956 until his death, and was elevated to the cardinalate in 1958.

Biography
William Godfrey was born in Liverpool to George and Mary Godfrey. His father was a haulage contractor. He leaned towards the priesthood from an early age, never taking any alternative into serious consideration. After studying at Ushaw College, Durham, and the English College, Rome, he was ordained a priest on 28 October 1916 in Rome. He then finished his studies in 1918, obtaining his doctorates in theology and philosophy in 1917, and did pastoral work in Liverpool until 1919. He taught Classics, Philosophy and Theology at Ushaw from 1918 to 1930, the year when he was appointed rector of the English College, Rome and given the title Monsignor (28 October). At the college, the strict priest was known to his students as "Uncle Bill". In 1935, Godfrey was made a member of the Pontifical Commission to Malta, and attended in an official capacity the 1937 coronation of King George VI and Queen Elizabeth.

On 21 November 1938, Mgr Godfrey was appointed Titular Archbishop of Cius and first Apostolic Delegate to Great Britain, Gibraltar and Malta. Godfrey, who was the first papal representative to England since the Reformation, received his episcopal consecration on the following 21 December, in the chapel of the English College from Cardinal Raffaele Rossi, OCD, with Archbishop Luigi Traglia and Bishop Ralph Hayes serving as co-consecrators. He was also chargé d'affaires of the Holy See to the Polish government-in-exile in London in 1943. He left these diplomatic posts on 10 November 1953 when he was made Archbishop of Liverpool.

Pope Pius XII appointed Godfrey Archbishop of Westminster, and thus the ranking prelate of the Catholic Church in England and Wales, on 3 December 1956. During his installation, Godfrey condemned Communism and professed his mission as bringing England "back to the love of Christ". He was vehemently opposed to birth control. At one point in his tenure, he caused some mirth by calling for English Catholics to feed their pets less during Lent.

Archbishop Godfrey was created Cardinal-Priest by Pope John XXIII in the consistory of 15 December 1958 and was assigned the title of Ss. Nereo ed Achilleo.

Godfrey, who enjoyed the piano and sports, lived long enough to attend only the first session of the Second Vatican Council in 1962. In January 1963, he died from a heart attack in London, at age 73. He is buried in Westminster Cathedral. His likeness was sculpted by Arthur Fleischmann.

References

External links
Cardinal William Godfrey
Cardinals of the Holy Roman Church
Catholic-Hierarchy 

1889 births
1963 deaths
Participants in the Second Vatican Council
Roman Catholic archbishops of Liverpool
Roman Catholic archbishops of Westminster
20th-century British cardinals
Clergy from Liverpool
Cardinals created by Pope John XXIII
English College, Rome alumni
Rectors of the English College, Rome
Pontifical Gregorian University alumni
Burials at Westminster Cathedral
Apostolic Nuncios to Great Britain
Alumni of Ushaw College
British Roman Catholic archbishops